The 2022 Chinese Football Association Cup, officially known as the Yanjing Beer 2022 Chinese FA Cup (Chinese: 燕京啤酒2022中国足球协会杯) for sponsorship reasons, was the 24th edition of the Chinese FA Cup.

The defending champions are Chinese Super League side Shandong Taishan.

Schedule

First round
The draw for the first round was held on 15 August 2022.

Second round
The draw for the second round was held on 5 September 2022.

Third round

Quarter-finals

First leg

Second leg

Semi-finals

Final

Notes

References

2022
2022 in Chinese football
2022 Asian domestic association football cups